Eric William Sturgess (10 May 1920 – 14 January 2004) was a South African male tennis player and winner of six Grand Slam doubles titles. He also reached the singles final of a Grand Slam tournament three times but never won. Sturgess was ranked World No. 6 by John Olliff of The Daily Telegraph in both 1948 and 1949.

Biography
Eric Sturgess was born in Johannesburg, where he attended Parktown Boys' High School. Sturgess joined the South African Air Force on the outbreak of World War II and became an instructor with No 4 Spitfire Squadron, SAAF. In October 1944 he was shot down by anti-aircraft fire, captured on landing and sent to the air force officers' prison camp, Stalag Luft III, in eastern Germany. In January 1945 he was transported to Stalag IIIA at Luckenwalde which was liberated two months later by the advancing Russian forces.

He reached the singles final of the 1947 and 1951 French Championships but lost to Hungarian József Asbóth (6–8, 5–7, 4–6) and Jaroslav Drobný (6–3, 6–3, 6–3) respectively. In 1947 he won the doubles competition with countryman Eustace Fannin. In 1948 he reached the singles final at the U.S. National Championships but lost to American Pancho Gonzales.

In 1947 and 1948 he won the British Hard Court Championships played in Bournemouth. He won the first three Swedish Open tournaments (1948, 1949, 1950), played in Båstad. Sturgess won a record 11 singles titles at the South African Championships between 1939 and 1957.

At both the 1951 and 1952 South African Open, he won in the finals playing Syd Levy of South Africa.

By the end of his career Sturgess had reached 15 Grand Slam finals (three in singles, six in doubles and six in mixed doubles). He won four titles (the 1947 French Championships doubles title, the 1949 French Championships mixed doubles title and the 1949 and 1950 Wimbledon mixed doubles title).

He represented South Africa in the Davis Cup competition in six ties, compiling a 13–5 record in singles and doubles.

Grand Slam finals

Singles (3 runner-ups)

Doubles (1 title, 5 runner-ups)

Mixed doubles (5 titles, 2 runner-ups)

References

External links 
 
 
 
 Telegraph obituary

South African people of British descent
French Championships (tennis) champions
Tennis players from Johannesburg
South African male tennis players
Wimbledon champions (pre-Open Era)
1920 births
2004 deaths
Grand Slam (tennis) champions in mixed doubles
Grand Slam (tennis) champions in men's doubles
Alumni of Parktown Boys' High School
White South African people
South African Air Force personnel of World War II